Villiappally is a census town in Kozhikode district in the Indian state of Kerala. Villiappally is the headquarters of Villiappally Panchayath, which contains two villages, Memunda and Villiappally.

Transportation
Villiappally village connects to other parts of India through Vatakara city on the west and Kuttiady town on the east.  National highway No.66 passes through Vatakara and the northern stretch connects to Mangalore, Goa and Mumbai.  The southern stretch connects to Cochin and Trivandrum.  The eastern Highway  going through Kuttiady connects to Mananthavady, Mysore and Bangalore. The nearest airports are at Kannur and Kozhikode.  The nearest railway station is at Vatakara.

Demographics
 Indian census, Villiappally had a population of 31,763. Males constitute 48% of the population and females 52%. Villiappally has an average literacy rate of 81%, higher than the national average of 59.5%: male literacy is 85%, and female literacy is 78%. In Villiappally, 11% of the population is under 6 years of age.

Educational institutions
Muslim Jama’ath(EMJAY) Vocational Higher Secondary School
Govt. Higher Secondary School (GHSS) Chorod
Memunda Higher secondary school
MES college

See also
 Nadapuram
 Thottilpalam
 Perambra
 Madappally
 Memunda
 Iringal
 Mahe, Pondicherry
 Payyoli
 Thikkodi
 Orkkatteri

References

Vatakara area